José Pedro de Morais (born 20 December 1955 in Kuito, Bie Province) is an Angolan politician, who served as Minister of Finance from December 2002 to October 2008, replacing Júlio Marcelino Vieira Bessa. In January 2015, he was appointed Governor of the National Bank of Angola.

Career
 Director, foreign trade, Ministry of Industry, 1977–1984; 
 United Nations Development Programme, 1984–87; 
 Director, international cooperation, Ministry of Industry, 1987; 
 Director, economic affairs, Ministry of External Relations, 1989–90; 
 Advisor, Ministry of Industry, 1990–91; 
 Secretary of State for Construction, 1991–92; 
 Governor, World Bank, 1993; 
 Coordinator, European Fund for Development, 1993; 
 Minister of Planning and Economic Coordination, 1994-1996; 
 Executive Director, International Monetary Fund, 1996 to date; 
 Minister of Finance, 2002-2008.

References

External links
 angola.org

1955 births
Living people
Angolan economists
Finance ministers of Angola
Angolan bankers
Governors of the Bank of Angola
MPLA politicians